Rakesh Rajani (born c. 1966) is a Tanzanian civil society leader. He has established and led key social initiatives in the evolution of education in Tanzania and East Africa starting in 1991 including hakielimu.org, especially as an advocate for young people through education and recently, with twaweza.org and uwezo.net, open government and ICT. In addition he helped set up and served as the first chairman of Policy Forum, a network of over 100 NGOs in Tanzania involved in helping 'policies work for people'. Rajani is considered a thought leader for much International Development work, particularly related to child rights, education, democracy and open government in East Africa and globally.

Life and career
Rajani was born in Tanzania where he completed his primary and secondary education, graduating from the International School Moshi in 1985. He then won a Wien Scholarship  for university studies in the USA, and graduated from Brandeis University with a BA in Philosophy and English Literature in 1989 and Harvard University with a MTS, (Liberation) Theology in 1991. While studying at Brandeis and Harvard, Rajani was part of the Catholic Worker movement at Haley House in Boston, MA.

From 1991 to 1998 Rajani co-founded and served as the first executive director of the Kuleana Centre for Children's Rights in his hometown of Mwanza, Tanzania. The organization worked with street children and advocated for children's interests across the country. The work with street children was based on a situation analysis that helped shift thinking about street children from a charity view to understanding deprivation was caused by a lack of rights. It received the Maurice Pate Award but is now largely defunct.

After Kuleana, Rajani served as a resident fellow at Harvard University's Center for Population and Development Studies and the Human Rights Program of the Harvard Law School from 1998 to 2000. He continued as a non-resident fellow for many years since, including serving as an associate of the Joint Learning Initiative on Children and HIV/AIDS from 2006 to 2009.

In 2001, Rajani founded HakiElimu and served as its executive director. Early on, the organization offered external advice on the primary education and secondary education development plans (PEDP and SEDP) that led to the expansion of government primary and secondary schooling in Tanzania throughout the 2000-2010 decade. Rajani also co-edited two volumes of speeches and papers on education by Julius Nyerere, Tanzania's founding president. Rajani stepped down as executive director at the end of 2007 but continued some work with the organization through its Board until 2009.

After leaving HakiElimu, in 2008 and 2009 Rajani worked as a consultant with Hivos, William and Flora Hewlett Foundation, Google.org and other agencies. His main work involved researching and advising on how citizen driven accountability could be strengthened in East Africa. This work led to the formation, in 2009, of Twaweza, a program to promote access to information, citizen agency and better service delivery in Tanzania, Kenya and Uganda. Through this Rajani played a key role in helping set up the Open Government Partnership, where he served as the civil society chairman for two years. A major project of Twaweza is Uwezo, which undertakes a large scale assessment of basic literacy and numeracy in Kenya, Uganda and Tanzania on a regular basis. The World Bank Development Report in 2018 was anchored in the main finding of this work. Another major program of the work started under Rajani's leadership is Africa's first nationally representative mobile phone survey, known as Sauti ya Wananchi (Citizen's Voices) which regularly collects and publishes independent and scientifically credible data.

Rajani stepped down from Twaweza in December 2014, and became director of the Democratic Participation and Governance program at the Ford Foundation in New York, USA in January 2015, charged with strengthening the organization's global engagement. From 2014 until 2015, Rajani served on United Nations Secretary-General Ban Ki-moon's Independent Expert Advisory Group on the Data Revolution for Sustainable Development, co-chaired by Enrico Giovannini and Robin Li.

Personal life
Rajani married in 1998 and has two children, Amar and Chhaya. Rajani was born into a Hindu family a

Publications
WorldCat search (21 Book listings, authored or coauthored by Rakesh Rajani)
Co-author, A “Socio Economic” Policy Case Study in Tanzania, Joint Learning Initiative on Children and HIV/AIDS (2008)
Are our Children Learning? a report assessing literacy and numeracy in Tanzania by Uwezo in 2010; other similar reports can be found on http://www.uwezo.net
Whose Business is Development? Experts in an Open Society
/12%20Public%20Accountability%20-%20Capacity%20is%20Political%20Not%20Technical%20-%20Rakesh%20Rajani%20-%20Capacity%20development%20in%20Practice%20chapter%2012%5B1%5D.pdf book chapter Capacity is Political, Not Technical
 Can Your Child Read and Count? Measuring Learning Outcomes in East Africa 
The Participation Rights of Adolescents, a paper for UNICEF, 2011

References

External links

LinkedIn Profile

1966 births
Living people
Brandeis University alumni
Harvard Divinity School alumni
Tanzanian people of Indian descent
Converts to Christianity from Hinduism
Tanzanian civil servants
People from Mwanza Region
Hewlett Foundation